Putumayo District is one of four districts of the Putumayo Province in Peru.

History 
Putumayo District belonged to Maynas Province until Putumayo Province was created on May 5, 2014 in President Ollanta Humala's term.

Geography 
It has an area of 34,942.9 km2.

Authorities

Mayors 
 2016–2018: Segundo Julca Ramos (Movimiento Integración Loretana).

See also 
 Administrative divisions of Peru

References

External links
 Municipalidad de Putumayo – City council official website (in Spanish)
 INEI Peru (in Spanish)

Districts of the Loreto Region
Districts of the Putumayo Province